Tommy McFarlane was a Scottish-American soccer center half who began his career in Scotland before moving to the United States.  He earned one cap with the U.S. national team in 1925.

Club career
McFarlane began his career with Partick Thistle of the Scottish Football League.  In 1921, he moved to the United States where he signed with the Fall River United of the American Soccer League.  After one season, he moved to the Bethlehem Steel.  While he began the 1924–1925 season with Bethlehem, he moved to J&P Coats after only four games.  McFarlane played eighteen games with J&P Coats, but was listed in June 1925 with amateur club Sayles.  That fall, McFarlane signed with J&P Coats and played with them through the end of the 1926–1927 season.

National team
McFarlane earned one cap with the U.S. national team in a 1–0 loss to Canada on 27 June 1925.

See also
List of United States men's international soccer players born outside the United States

References

Footballers from Glasgow
Partick Thistle F.C. players
United States men's international soccer players
American Soccer League (1921–1933) players
Scottish emigrants to the United States
Fall River Marksmen players
Bethlehem Steel F.C. (1907–1930) players
Indiana Flooring players
J&P Coats players
American soccer players
Association football midfielders
Year of birth missing